Georgetown is an unincorporated community on U.S. Route 19 in Monongalia County, West Virginia, United States.

Georgetown most likely was named after George Pratt, an early settler.

References

Unincorporated communities in Monongalia County, West Virginia
Unincorporated communities in West Virginia
Morgantown metropolitan area